Joseph Philippe Gentil (9 February 1928 - 26 January 2021), was a Mauritian composer best known for composing The Motherland, the National Anthem of Mauritius.

Joseph Philippe Gentil was born in the island of Mauritius, Indian Ocean of Irene Annibal and Eugene Gentil son of photographer, musician and conductor, Gabriel Gentil. He worked for over 30 years in the Mauritius Police Force, more precisely with the Mauritius Police Band as a musician and composer. He was known in his younger days for his comedies performed live in open air such as at the Jardin De La Compagnie, Port Louis. He later became well known on MBC TV for his comedy gigs. He has introduced various European and American musical talents to the Mauritian community by covering their songs, such as Fernandel, Bourvil, Glenn Miller Band, Louis Armstrong, and Henri Salvador. He has composed various marches performed by the Mauritius Police Band; unfortunately, many of his compositions were destroyed when the band's room in Vacoas burned down. However one of his compositions remains as the National Anthem of Mauritius, the Motherland which he won as a competition when Mauritius became independent from the British Empire in 1968.

The lyrics were written by Mauritian poet Jean-Georges Prosper.

On the day of independence, 12 March 1968 a national newspaper mistakenly published the name and photograph of Philippe Oh San who was the Mauritius Police Band's maestro as the National Anthem's composer. The remaining newspapers were returned to be reprinted with the correction. As a result, it has left the name of Mr. Oh San in the mind of many Mauritians as being the anthem's composer. However it was Mr. Oh San who after hearing Mr. Gentil's anthem being performed by the band musicians, encouraged for the work to be entered into the contest for a new National Anthem and after receiving Mr. Jean Georges Prosper's lyric as proposal for the anthem found that the lyric perfectly matched the melody composed by Philippe Gentil, the two being created separately.

Following the release of the  Motherland as the National Anthem, Gentil was appointed Member of the Order of the British Empire M.B.E. from the late Queen Elizabeth II of the United Kingdom and in 2008 and 2010 obtained other titles of the Officer of the Order of the Star and Key of the Indian Ocean O.S.K. and Commander of the Order of the Star and Key of the Indian Ocean C.S.K. from the Mauritian government for his musical service to the Mauritian nation. On he 8th of March 2019, Philippe Gentil was conferred by the Municipal Council of Quatre Bornes the Honorary Freedom of the Town of Quatre Bornes.

Philippe Gentil has been the tutor and mentor for many musicians and professional performers for the largest part of his life. From the time of his retirement in 1988, he formed and directed a new band for the Police officers of the Beau-Bassin Prison for about 20 years which he then left in the hand of others. He is survived by his spouse Claudette Ivy Gentil known also as Diane, born Claudette Ivy Castel (1940) with whom he had a late daughter named Marie-Danielle Gentil (b 1960) and a son Jacques Philippe Mario Gentil (b 1961).

References

External links 

 The National Anthems of The World (Naxos) 

1928 births
2021 deaths
Mauritian musicians
National anthem writers
Members of the Order of the British Empire